The Redesdale Bridge is one of the oldest iron lattice-truss bridges in Victoria, Australia. The Redesdale Bridge is a wrought iron and timber structure with bluestone abutments, located over the Campaspe River near the town of Redesdale.

History
The bridge was completed in January 1868, despite a carved commemoration stone having the date 1867. In early 2015, the name of Redesdale Bridge was adopted by the Office of Geographic Names and formally gazetted in the Victorian Government Gazette on 19 March 2015.

The trusses for the bridge were originally imported for the Hawthorn Bridge over the Yarra River connecting the suburbs of Richmond and Hawthorn in 1859. The ship Herald of the Morning, at the end of its second voyage to Australia in 1859, whilst bringing 419 immigrants and a mixed cargo that included the wrought iron trusses, caught fire and sank in Hobsons Bay. As a result, the Hawthorn bridge was delayed for several years while new trusses were made and shipped out to Australia.

Ten years later the original trusses were salvaged from the Herald of the Morning at the bottom of Hobsons Bay  and sold privately to the Melbourne foundry Langlands & Co. The wreck was advertised for sale on 29 November 1859.
Two hundred tons of ironwork were purchased by the goldfields shires of McIvor and Metcalfe for £1000. Prominent Melbourne engineer T B Muntz designed the bridge and a contractor named Doran won the construction contract. The final cost of the bridge was £6274.

The bridge was constructed with a divided-lane through-truss design created specifically for the difficult river crossing and unique in Victoria. The trusses were originally intended for a deck truss design, but were adapted to allow their use as through trusses with stiffening arches connecting them above the roadway. Two separate roadways with an intervening stone pillar separating them have caused problems for modern traffic. The road deck is made with longitudinal timber planks on large timber cross girders that are supported on the lower chords of the trusses.

Similar bridge 
Whereas the huge lattice truss girders of the Redesdale Bridge had been imported from England in 1859, the colonial engineering works which had in the meantime developed to service reef and deep lead mining were quite capable of supplying such products for the Central Victorian, Glenmona Bridge, by 1870.

See also
 Glenmona Bridge
 Hawthorn Bridge

References

External links

 Rasmussen, C. "A Tale of Two Bridges: The Hawthorn Bridge Controversy 1929-30", Victorian Historical Journal, Vol 63 No 1, June 1992. Melbourne, Victoria: Royal Historical Society of Victoria.

Road bridges in Victoria (Australia)
Victorian Heritage Register
Bridges completed in 1868
1868 establishments in Australia
Truss bridges in Australia